Gordon Derrick was born in the twin island state of Antigua and Barbuda located in the Caribbean in 1968. He grew up in the outskirts of St. John's town in the area known as Villa. He is married and has two children.

Derrick served as director of the Antigua Commercial Bank between 2004 -2015. He also served as Chairman of the board of directors of ACB Mortgage and Trust Ltd. from 2007 - 2016

Derrick holds an MBA from the University of the West Indies (UWI) and Bachelor of Science Degree in Mechanical Engineering from the Florida Institute of Technology (FIT).

References

Florida Institute of Technology alumni
University of the West Indies alumni
Living people
1968 births
People from Saint John Parish, Antigua
Association football executives